The men's 4 × 400 metres relay at the 2013 Asian Athletics Championships was held at the Shiv Chhatrapati Stadium in Pune, India on 7 July.

References
Results

400 Men's Relay
Relays at the Asian Athletics Championships